Liechtenstein is a principality in the Alps and a microstate. Despite its small landmass of only 160 km2 and a population of 38,111 Liechtenstein has a very successful industrial sector and a strong banking industry, making the country one of the most prosperous nations in the world. The domestic unemployment rate is 1,7 % and about 54% of all employees employed in Liechtenstein are commuters from neighbouring countries.

Notable firms 
This list includes notable companies with primary headquarters located in the country. The industry and sector follow the Industry Classification Benchmark taxonomy.

See also 
 Economy of Liechtenstein

Liechtenstein

Companies

 Companies